Tracy Walker may refer to:

R. Tracy Walker (1939–2019), American politician
Tracy Walker (American football) (born 1995), American football defensive back